The African Cup of Champions Clubs 1973 was the 9th edition of the annual international club football competition held in the CAF region (Africa), the African Cup of Champions Clubs. It determined that year's club champion of association football in Africa.

The tournament was played by 24 teams and used a knock-out format with ties played home and away. AS Vita Club from Zaire won the final, and became CAF club champion for the first time.

First round

|}
1

Second round

|}
1

Quarter-finals

|}
1

Semi-finals

|}

Final

Champion

Top scorers
The top scorers from the 1973 African Cup of Champions Clubs are as follows:

External links
African Cup of Champions results at Rec.Sport.Soccer Statistics Foundation

1
African Cup of Champions Clubs